539 Raiding Squadron Royal Marines (RM) is 3 Commando Brigade's integral amphibious movement capability, delivering them on to land from water and patrolling waterways.  It also contains the Royal Marines Armoured Support Group operating the Viking BvS10 All Terrain Amphibious Armoured Vehicle. They are based in the new Royal Marines Tamar complex at the northern end of HMNB Devonport.

History

539 ASRM was formed on 2 April 1984 and commissioned as operational on 24 July 1984. This was in direct response to lessons learned during the Falklands Conflict in 1982. More recent operations include Operation Telic. 539 ASRM supported 3 Commando Brigade as it took the Al-Faw Peninsula, carrying out numerous operations such as several landings and the clearing of various waterways. 539 ASRM continued to operate in Iraq, performing security patrols of Iraq's southern ports and water networks until the end of Operation Telic. 

In July 2011 a landing craft from RFA Cardigan Bay landed two  Vikings and Royal Marines of 539 Assault Squadron in Somaliland. They penetrated several miles of insecure territory to meet up with an important clan chief and take him back to Cardigan Bay for a meeting with MI6 and Foreign Office officials. This was part of Exercise Somaliland Cougar, an operation to train Somali coastguards in anti-piracy techniques and to establish relationships with tribal leaders.

As of 2017, the Squadron consisted of over 100 personnel and was equipped with a variety of Landing Craft including Hovercraft (LCAC(L)), Rigid Raiders and Landing Craft Vehicle/Personnel. 539 Assault Squadron was named after the famous 539 Assault Flotilla which landed on Gold Beach during the Invasion of Normandy.

On 5 November 2019 the unit was renamed 539 Raiding Squadron RM.

References

External links
539 Assault Squadron
539ASRM - The Genesis of a Unique Squadron

Royal Marine formations and units
Military units and formations established in 1984